The  is a building created by Japanese artist Tarō Okamoto. It was known as the symbol of Expo '70 and currently is preserved and located in the Expo Commemoration Park in Suita, Osaka Prefecture, Japan. The tower has three faces on its front and back.

History 
The tower was built for Expo '70 and housed in the Festival Plaza building known as "Big Roof" designed by Japanese architect Kenzo Tange. The tip of the tower projected out of the Big Roof's ceiling due to the height of the building. After the completion of the tower projecting through the Big Roof, a Japanese science fiction writer, Sakyo Komatsu, looked at it and said he associated it with a sexual description in a Japanese novel, Season of the Sun, where a character broke through a sliding paper door. The creator of the tower, Taro Okamoto, heard about it, and named the tower as the "Tower of the Sun".

The tower was open to the public and visitors could enter inside during the expo, yet it was closed after the event. The gallery inside displayed a huge artwork called the "Tree of Life", which represented the evolution of creatures. Tsuburaya Productions partly produced the artwork. The Big Roof housing the tower was removed in 1979, causing the tower to be exposed for a long time. The tower has gradually deteriorated. Once a claim to demolish it arose, yet it was decided to be preserved and repair work began in November 1994, ending in March 1995.

On October 11 and 12, 2003, the inside of the Tower of the Sun was opened to a selected 1,970 people (the figure was chosen for the year the expo was held). Prior to the opening, over 24,000 people applied for it so the Commemorative Organization for the Japan World Exposition '70 made a decision to open the tower again in November and December in the same year. Those and subsequent, similar events that took place at irregular intervals were attended by over 40,000 people in total visited the inside of the tower until October 2006. Due to the repair and renovation for the 40th anniversary event of the Expo '70 in 2010, access to the Tower's interior was closed again. After additional repairs it was to be permanently open to the public starting in 2014. However, it was finally permanently reopened in March 2018. New features such as a reconstructed “Sun of the Underworld”, complete with animation, were installed.

Overview 
The tower's height is 70 metres, the diameter at the base is 20 metres, and each of the two arms is 25 metres long. The tower has currently three faces, two faces on the front, and a face in the back. The face located at the top, whose diameter is 11 metres, represents the future. An antenna attached to it works as a conductor. In the eyes of the face, Xenon arc lamps were used during the expo, however they became decrepit and broken down after the expo. On September 25, 2004, new lights were installed next to the old ones and lit to advertise the Expo 2005. A face between two arms represents the present, and a black face on the rear of the tower is the sun of the past. Originally another face, "Sun of the Underworld" was located on the basement floor, yet currently it has been moved to an unknown location. The jagged red paintings on the front of the tower represent thunder.

Inside of the tower, an artwork called the "Tree of Life" was exhibited, and many miniatures and objects created by Tsuburaya Productions were suspended from the tree. It was 45 metres high and represents the strength of the life heading to the future. In the tower, there were moving staircases surrounding the tree and a lift which enabled visitors to go to the upper floor. One of the lifts inside was connected to a part of the Big Roof through the opened wall, which was closed after the expo. Originally, "The Tower of Mother" and "The Tower of Youth" were also placed on the east and west area in the expo, both were created by Taro Okamoto, and later they were removed.

A miniature version of the Tower of the Sun is located in the Taro Okamoto Museum of Art. The tower has also been listed as one of the Best 100 Media Arts in Japan by the Agency for Cultural Affairs.

In popular culture
In 1997, Naoko Yamano, guitarist and founding member of the Osaka-based pop/punk band Shonen Knife wrote a song called "Tower of the Sun" which appears on the band's 1997 album Brand New Knife.

In 2007, the tower is briefly shown in the anime Moonlight Miles season 1 and 2.

In 2014, Bandai created , a 288mm Chogokin toy replica of the Tower of the Sun that transforms into a giant robot. As part of ad campaign for the model, the tower is shown in a short animated sequence in which would transform and briefly fight a monster in same style as tokusatsu programs.

According to Pokémon Black and White art director Ken Sugimori, the Pokémon Larvesta is partially inspired by the Tower of the Sun; specifically, the red growths surrounding Larvesta's head.

The Tower of the Sun, as well as the Expo of 1970, plays a central role in Naoki Urasawa's manga: 20th Century Boys. In this series the tower becomes one of the main symbols of the "cult of the friend," an evil association that wants to conquer the world. It also appears in the film I Wish.

The Tower of the Sun, like many of Okamoto's works, was used as homage in the character of Deidara from the Naruto series. In the Tower's case, it is depicted as an explosion in the character's suicidal attack.

The Tower of the Sun shows up as a pilotable giant mecha in the 2010 Shingo Honda's manga Hakaiju. It's also featured on the cover of volume 18 of the same manga.

In the Pokémon anime. Sunyshore Tower resembles the Tower of the Sun.

References

External links 

 The Tower of the Sun
 Google 3D Warehouse

Buildings and structures in Osaka Prefecture
Expo '70
Monuments and memorials in Japan
Outdoor sculptures in Japan
Tourist attractions in Osaka Prefecture
World's fair architecture in Japan